Wilfred Raleigh Pastrano (November 27, 1935 – December 6, 1997) was an American former professional boxer who competed from 1951 to 1965. He held the undisputed WBA, WBC, and The Ring light heavyweight titles between 1963 and 1965.

Early life
Pastrano was born in New Orleans. Pastrano's best friend, Ralph Dupas started training in boxing at a local gym. Pastrano, who weighed over 250 pounds, decided to start working out with his friend.

As Willie lost weight, he realized two things. First, he loved boxing. Second, he hated getting hit. So, Pastrano developed a style of boxing in which he hardly got hit, and in return, tried not to hurt his opponent as well.

Pastrano was already married as a teenager, and by 1962, he and his wife Faye had five children: John (born 1955), Donna (1957), Frank (1959), Nicholas (1960), and Angelo (1962).

Pro career
Pastrano began his career at the age of 16.  He fought many heavyweights and outpointed heavyweight contenders  Rex Layne, Brian London, and Tom McNeeley.

The talented Pastrano won the world light heavyweight championship when he outpointed the great Harold Johnson on a close 15-round decision. He successfully defended his crown by stopping Gregorio Peralta of Argentina on a TKO, and by coming back from a certain defeat on points to KO English challenger Terry Downes in 11 rounds in Manchester, England.  Pastrano lost his crown when he was TKOed by José Torres in 10 rounds (the same fight where the ringside doctor asked if he knew where he was, leading to Pastrano's legendary line of "You're damn right I know where I am! I'm in Madison Square Garden getting the shit kicked out of me!"). In the Torres fight, Pastrano was knocked down for the only time in his career by a powerful left hook to the liver. Pastrano retired after that match and never fought again.

Managed by the legendary Angelo Dundee, Pastrano was a smooth, quick boxer with a great left hand. He was a stablemate of Cassius Clay and often sparred with the future champion early in Clay's career. His talent was dissipated by his aversion to training and a fondness for partying and carousing. His success was also limited by his lack of punching power, hence his record of only 14 knockout wins in his 84 fights.  Nevertheless, he defeated most of the light heavyweight challengers of his generation. He also outpointed former light heavyweight champion Joey Maxim, and boxed a draw with the legendary Archie Moore. He retired with a record of 63 wins (14 by KO), 13 losses and 8 draws.

Perhaps in the high point of his career, Pastrano appeared on the cover of March 22, 1965, issue of Sports Illustrated with the caption reading "Light Heavyweight Willie Pastrano Ready to Defend His Title".

Life after boxing

After he retired from boxing, Pastrano became a spokesman for a local Miami, Florida milk company. On August 30, 1966 in the Milwaukee Sentinel, it was reported that Pastrano had been secretly training for a comeback, but an auto injury had sidelined it.

In 1967, Pastrano became the official host of the Presidential Steak House in Miami Beach, Florida.

However, urged on by his good friend, singer Steve Alaimo, Pastrano embarked on a film career which spanned from 1967 to 1971.

In 1964, Pastrano appeared on the Jackie Gleason Show.

Pastrano's best regarded acting role was in the "B" motorcycle gang film, The Wild Rebels, which starred Steve Alaimo.

Pastrano said in a 1980 interview he was a heroin addict from 1966 to 1969. In the same interview, he claimed to have robbed to support his drug addiction.

He became a drifter. Owen Thomas helped him out in his time of need. He worked as a host in a restaurant in Reno, Nevada; a chip runner in Las Vegas, and a bouncer in a strip-club in Miami

His well-documented party life-style led to health problems, and Pastrano's film career ended. While living in Las Vegas in the early 1970s, he claimed to be training for a comeback when interviewed for the book, In This Corner.

Pastrano was reported to be boxing in Puerto Rico in 1972, but a fighter was using a name similar to the former champion, Willie Pastrana. Pastrano never made a comeback.

In 1980, Pastrano was the manager for pro-boxer, Chubby Johnson in New Orleans.

After many years of failing health, Pastrano died of liver cancer on December 9, 1997 at the age of 62.

Professional boxing record

See also
List of light-heavyweight boxing champions

References

External links

Willie Pastrano - CBZ Profile

|-

 

|- 

|-

|-

1935 births
1997 deaths
American people of Italian descent
American male boxers
Light-heavyweight boxers
World light-heavyweight boxing champions
World Boxing Association champions
World Boxing Council champions
The Ring (magazine) champions
Sportspeople from New Orleans
Deaths from liver cancer
International Boxing Hall of Fame inductees